Sîngereii Noi is a commune in Sîngerei District, Moldova. It is composed of two villages, Mărinești and Sîngereii Noi.

References

Communes of Sîngerei District